SevenDust is a computer virus that infects computers running certain versions of the classic Mac OS. It was first discovered in 1998, and originally referred to as 666 by Apple.

SevenDust is a polymorphic virus, with some variant also being encrypted. It spreads by users running an infected executable. Some variants of SevenDust also delete all non-application files accessed during certain times.

See also 
Computer virus
Comparison of computer viruses

References

External links 
666, by McAfee

Classic Mac OS viruses
1998 in technology